The Other Barack: The Bold and Reckless Life of President Obama's Father is a biography written by Sally H. Jacobs, a Boston Globe journalist. The book states that Barack Obama, Sr and Ann Dunham considered giving Barack Obama up for adoption to the Salvation Army.

References

External links
After Words interview with Jacobs on The Other Barack, July 23, 2011

2011 non-fiction books
Books about Barack Obama
American political books
PublicAffairs books